John Cuneo may refer to:

 John Cuneo (illustrator) (born 1957), American illustrator
 John Cuneo (sailor) (1928–2020), Australian sailor